Sichuan cuisine, alternatively romanized as Szechwan cuisine or Szechuan cuisine, is a style of Chinese cuisine originating from Sichuan Province. It has bold flavours, particularly the pungency and spiciness resulting from liberal use of garlic and chili peppers, as well as the unique flavour of Sichuan pepper. Some examples are Kung Pao chicken and Yuxiang shredded pork. There are many local variations within Sichuan Province and the neighbouring Chongqing Municipality, which was part of Sichuan Province until 1997. Four sub-styles of Sichuan cuisine include Chongqing, Chengdu, Zigong and Buddhist vegetarian style.

UNESCO declared Chengdu, the capital of Sichuan Province, to be a city of gastronomy in 2011 to recognise the sophistication of its cooking.

History
Sichuan in the Middle Ages welcomed Middle Eastern crops, such as broad beans, sesame and walnuts. Since the 16th century, the list of major crops in Sichuan has even been lengthened by New World newcomers. The characteristic chili pepper came from Mexico, but probably overland from India or by river from Macau, complementing the traditional Sichuan peppercorn. Other newcomers from the New World included maize (corn), which largely replaced millet; white potatoes introduced by Catholic missions; and sweet potatoes. The population of Sichuan was cut by perhaps three quarters in the wars from the Ming dynasty to the Qing dynasty. Settlers from the adjacent Hunan Province brought their cooking styles with them.

Sichuan is colloquially known as the "heavenly country" due to its abundance of food and natural resources. One ancient Chinese account declared that the "people of Sichuan uphold good flavour, and they are fond of hot and spicy taste." Most Sichuan dishes are spicy, although a typical meal includes non-spicy dishes to cool the palate. Sichuan cuisine is composed of seven basic flavours: sweet, sour, numbing-spicy (like in Sichuan pepper), spicy, bitter, fragant/aromatic, and salty. Sichuan food is divided into five different types: sumptuous banquet, ordinary banquet, popularised food, household-style food and snacks. Milder versions of Sichuan dishes remain a staple of American Chinese cuisine.

The superior natural resources of Sichuan Province provided plenty natural resources for the development of cooking. The flow of Yangtze river (the third longest river in the world and the longest river in China) through Sichuan Province sat the fundamental food materials, spices, and water resources.

Features

The complex topography  of Sichuan Province, including its mountains, hills, plains, plateaus and the Sichuan Basin, has shaped its food customs with versatile and distinct ingredients.

Abundant rice and vegetables are produced from the fertile Sichuan Basin, whereas a wide variety of herbs, mushrooms and other fungi prosper in the highland regions. Pork is overwhelmingly the most common type of meat consumed. Beef is somewhat more common in Sichuan cuisine than it is in other Chinese cuisines, perhaps due to the prevalence of oxen in the region. Sichuan cuisine also uses various bovine and porcine organs as ingredients, such as intestine, arteries, head, tongue, skin and liver, in addition to other commonly used portions of the meat. Rabbit meat is also much more popular in Sichuan than elsewhere in China. It is estimated that the Sichuan Basin and Chongqing area are responsible for about 70 percent of China's total rabbit meat consumption. Yoghurt, which probably spread from India through Tibet in medieval times, is consumed among the Han Chinese. This is an unusual custom in other parts of the country. The salt produced from Sichuan salt springs and wells, unlike sea salt, does not contain iodine, which led to goiter problems before the 20th century.

Sichuan cuisine often contains food preserved through pickling, salting and drying. Preserved dishes are generally served as spicy dishes with heavy application of chili oil.

The most unique and important spice in Sichuan cuisine is the Sichuan pepper. Sichuan peppercorn has an intense fragrant, citrus-like flavour and produces a "tingly-numbing" sensation in the mouth. Other commonly used spices in Sichuan cuisine are garlic, chili peppers, ginger and star anise.

Broad bean chili paste is one of the most important seasonings. It is an essential component to famous dishes such as Mapo tofu and double-cooked pork slices. Sichuan cuisine is the origin of several prominent sauces/flavours widely used in modern Chinese cuisine, including:
 Yuxiang (魚香)
 Mala (麻辣) 
 Guaiwei (怪味)
Other examples of mixed flavor including spicy and hot (Mala), fish flavor (Yuxiang), hot and sour, the five spices (Wuxiang; 五香), ginger juice, mashed garlic, sweet and sour, spice salt (Jiaoyan; 椒盐), dried tangerine or orange peel (Chenpi; 陈皮), burnt chili, pot-stewed fowl (Lu; 卤味), odd flavor (Guaiwei; 怪味), and other recombinations of these seasonings.

Common preparation techniques in Sichuan cuisine include stir frying, steaming and braising, but a complete list would include more than 20 distinct techniques.

Meal styles
Sichuan hotpot, the most famous Chinese hotpot, is one of the representative dishes in Sichuan cuisine and famous for its numb and spicy taste. The tradition may owe itself to the area's high humidity, whereby the locals eat spicy food to remove the moisture from their bodies.

Leng dan bei is a style of street food that has emerged in Chengdu, Sichuan in recent years. Initially, leng dan bei mainly took the form of outdoor stalls, offering beer and simple snacks to accompany the drinks during summer nights. But now, it has developed into a local specialty, to the extent that many restaurants that offer other cuisines will also set up leng dan bei stalls at night. Therefore, leng dan bei is very popular in Chengdu.

The dishes served in leng dan bei mainly consist of cold dishes that are served quickly. Typical dishes include boiled peanuts, boiled edamame, braised dried tofu, braised pig's head meat, cold noodles, and other cold salads and braised dishes. There are also stir-fried dishes such as cold shredded potatoes, crispy green peppers, stir-fried green beans, stir-fried snails, and stir-fried crayfish, depending on the style. Some leng dan bei restaurants also offer hot dishes such as gan guo, Sichuan-style seafood, and barbecue.

Leng dan bei generally does not involve staple foods, like rice. Customers mainly drink beer, but some places also offer plum wine, limoncello, and other infused alcohols.

Notable foods

See also

Hunan cuisine
Chen Kenmin
Chen Kenichi
List of Chinese dishes

References

Further reading
. Internet Archive ONLINE
Fuchsia Dunlop. Shark's Fin and Sichuan Pepper: A Sweet-Sour Memoir of Eating in China. (New York: Norton,  2008). . The author's experience and observations, especially in Sichuan.
. Internet Archive ONLINE.
E. N. Anderson. "Sichuan (Szechuan) Cuisine,"  in Solomon H. Katz, William Woys Weaver. Encyclopedia of Food and Culture. (New York: Scribner,  2003). Vol I  pp. 393–395.
Lu Yi, Du li. China Sichuan Cuisine (Chinese and English) Bilingual . Sichuan Publishing House of Science and Technology, 2010. .
Che Fu. Talk About Sichuan Flavor (Chinese Edition). Sichuan Literature & Art Publishing, 2011. .

External links
NPR story on Sichuan cuisine and a cookbook about the cuisine

 
 
Regional cuisines of China